Normen Weber (born 18 October 1985) is a German male canoeist who won 15 medals at senior level at the Wildwater Canoeing World Championships.

Medals at the World Championships
Senior

References

External links
 

1985 births
Living people
German male canoeists
Place of birth missing (living people)